The Charleston Port of Embarkation (CPOE) was a United States Army Port of Embarkation (POE) responsible for the movement of troops and supplies from the United States to overseas commands. The CPOE was established in Charleston to relieve pressure on the New York Port of Embarkation with initial responsibility largely centered on the West Indies and Caribbean. After the United States entered the war Charleston became a POE in its own right. Later in the war, more use was be made of the Port, and it was designated as the home port for Army hospital ships serving the European and Mediterranean theaters. In the spring of 1943 the Chief of Transportation began to train personnel for the operation and maintenance of small boats and amphibian trucks there, before they were moved to Camp Gordon Johnston. The CPOE also served as a training place for army beach landings.

James E. Slack and James T. Duke commanded the port. Originally the Charleston Ordnance Depot, it was redesigned the Charleston Port of Embarkation during World War II. On July 1, 1952, it officially became the Charleston Transportation Corps Marine Depot. Though the facilities for shipping medical supplies from Charleston, South Carolina, were not complete until after the war’s end, the first three hospital ships were assigned to the port on November 1, 1943, the USAHS Acadia, the USAHS Seminole, and USAHS Shamrock. The port also trained the first Harbor Craft Companies. From December 1941 to August 1945, the port carried 35,495 people, and 3,215,981 pounds of supplies. At the peak of the war, 21 of 26 hospital ships were assigned to the CPOE.

References

Sources 

 

Military units and formations of the United States in World War II